The Alliance of the Revolutionary Socialists (abbreviated ARS) is a Russian communist organization with anti-capitalist views. It believes in "a society without private property, classes, states, wage labour, money and commodity production".

References

Communist organizations in Russia
Far-left politics in Russia